This is a list of the most consecutive starts and games played by a player by position in the National Football League (NFL).

Quarterback Brett Favre's streak of 297 consecutive games started is the longest all-time. Among defensive players, Jim Marshall's 270 is the longest. Of special note is punter Jeff Feagles, who played in 352 consecutive games which is the longest of all-time for a special teams player. Special teams players are not credited with starts in the NFL. In 2018, Ryan Kerrigan became the most recent player to surpass someone at his position for consecutive starts, having broken the previous mark for left outside linebackers previously held by Jason Gildon.

Leaderboards
Bold denotes an active streak

Consecutive games started

All-time starts

Minimum 200 consecutive regular season starts

Active leaders
Minimum 100 consecutive regular season starts

Charles Leno
LT - WAS - 121

Consecutive games played

All-time games played
Top 25 players for consecutive regular season games played

Consecutive starts by position

Offensive skilled

Offensive linemen

Defensive linemen

Linebackers

Defensive backs

Special teams

Note: Games played by special teams players such as kickers and punters are not recognized officially as starts by the NFL.

See also
Iron man
List of most consecutive starts by a National Football League quarterback
List of NFL players by games played
List of National Football League records (individual)#Starts
List of most consecutive games with touchdown passes in the National Football League

References

National Football League records and achievements
National Football League lists

ja:NFLのクォーターバック連続先発出場記録